The 60th Nova Scotia general election may refer to
2006 Nova Scotia general election, the 59th overall general election for Nova Scotia, for the (due to a counting error in 1859) 60th General Assembly of Nova Scotia
2009 Nova Scotia general election, the 60th overall general election for Nova Scotia, for the 61st General Assembly of Nova Scotia